Selwyns Wood is a   nature reserve west of Heathfield in Sussex. It is managed by the Sussex Wildlife Trust.

This reserve has woodland with extensive sweet chestnut, a stream in a narrow valley and an area of heather. There is a variety of breeding woodland birds, including willow warblers, chiffchaffs, nuthatches and marsh tits.

References

Sussex Wildlife Trust